Pedro Rubiano Sáenz (born September 13, 1932) is a cardinal and Roman Catholic Archbishop Emeritus of Bogotá in the Roman Catholic Church.

Early life and ordination
Born in Cartago, Colombia, Rubiano Sáenz studied at the seminary in Popayán before his being ordained as a priest on 8 July 1956. He did pastoral ministry 1956–1971. Pastor and founder of the parishes of "San Pedro Claver" and of "Nuestra Señora de la Providencia". He served as treasurer and pastoral vicar of the archdiocese of Cali and vice-rector of the Major School "Santiago di Cali".

Bishop and Archbishop
In 1971, he was named Bishop of Cúcuta. He was consecrated only fifteen years after his ordination to the priesthood and just within the canonical limit, on 11 July 1972 in Cali, by Archbishop Angelo Palmas, nuncio to Colombia. He was appointed Coadjutor Archbishop of Cali in 1983 and was transferred to the metropolitan and primatial see of Bogotá, 27 December 1994. From 1990 to 1996, he chaired the Colombian Bishops' Conference. On July 11, 2021 he celebrated the golden jubilee of his episcopal ministry after earlier in 2021 celebrating 65 years of his ordination to the priesthood on June 8, 2021.

Cardinal

Pope John Paul II made Rubiano Sáenz Cardinal-Priest of Trasfigurazione di Nostro Signore Gesù Cristo in the consistory of February 21, 2001. In 2002, he was elected president of the Colombian Episcopal Conference, and he was one of the cardinal electors who participated in the 2005 papal conclave that elected Pope Benedict XVI.  Cardinal Rubiano Sáenz's resignation as Archbishop of Bogotá was accepted by Pope Benedict on 8 July 2010. He was apostolic administrator of the archdiocese until the installation of his successor, Archbishop Jesus Salazar Gómez, on August 13, 2010.

Views

Abortion
Rubiano Sáenz has pleaded with anti-abortion advocates worldwide to join in a massive prayer effort to stop abortion from being legalized in the country. He warned that the procedure leads to an automatic excommunication.

Colombian President
Pedro Rubiano Saenz of Bogotá expressed his opposition against conservative President Álvaro Uribe running for re-election in 2010.

Chavez and FARC rebels
Rubiano Saenz has said that the intervention by Venezuelan President Hugo Chávez is not necessary for achieving an agreement over the exchange of prisoners with the Marxists rebel group FARC.

Honors 
Sáenz has been honored with the following:
  Order of Boyacá
  Sovereign Military Order of Malta
  Order pro merito Melitensi

References

External links
 
 Biography at catholic-pages.com

1932 births
Living people
20th-century Roman Catholic archbishops in Colombia
21st-century Roman Catholic archbishops in Colombia
Colombian cardinals
Roman Catholic archbishops of Bogotá
Cardinals created by Pope John Paul II
Members of the Order of the Holy Sepulchre
People from Valle del Cauca Department
Roman Catholic archbishops of Cali
Roman Catholic bishops of Cúcuta